Bob Moses (born January 28, 1948) is an American jazz drummer.

Biography 
He was born in New York, United States. Moses played with Roland Kirk in 1964–65 while he was still a teenager. In 1966, he and Larry Coryell formed The Free Spirits, a jazz fusion ensemble, and from 1967 to 1969 he played in Gary Burton's quartet, including drumming for the Grammy-nominated album Gary Burton Quartet in Concert. He played on the landmark 1967 Burton album A Genuine Tong Funeral, but due to creative disputes with the album's composer Carla Bley the drummer was credited as "Lonesome Dragon". Moses and Bley would later reconcile and he became a vocal booster for her music.

Moses recorded with Burton in the 1970s, in addition to work with Dave Liebman/Open Sky, Pat Metheny, Mike Gibbs, Hal Galper, Gil Goldstein, Steve Swallow, Steve Kuhn/Sheila Jordan (from 1979 to 1982), George Gruntz, and Emily Remler (from 1983 to 1984).  In the early 1970s he was a member of Compost with Harold Vick, Jumma Santos,  and Jack DeJohnette.

His first release as a leader was 1968's Love Animal. His second release was 1973's Bittersuite in the Ozone.  His records for Gramavision in the 1980s were critically acclaimed.

He is the author of the drum method book Drum Wisdom.

Moses performs alongside John Lockwood, Don Pate, and John Medeski with guitarist Tisziji Muñoz and teaches at New England Conservatory.

In 2022, he recorded a trio album with the Norwegian bassist Arild Andersen and Slovenian guitarist Samo Salamon entitled Pure and Simple.

Discography

As leader
 Bittersuite in the Ozone (Mozown, 1975)
 Tributaries with Richard Sussman, Andy LaVerne (Inner City, 1979)
 Family (Sutra, 1980)
 When Elephants Dream of Music (Gramavision, 1983)
 Visit with the Great Spirit (Gramavision, 1984)
 The Story of Moses (Gramavision, 1987)
 Drumming Birds with Billy Martin (ITM, 1987)
 Wheels of Colored Light (Open Minds, 1992)
 Time Stood Still (Gramavision, 1994)
 Devotion (Soul Note, 1996)
 Love Everlasting with Tisziji Muñoz (Amulet, 1999)
 Nishoma (Grapeshot, 2000)
 Love Animal (Amulet, 2003)
 Meditation On Grace with Michel Lambert (FMR, 2008)
 Father's Day B'hash (Sunnyside, 2009)
 The Illuminated Heart (Ra-Kalam, 2012)
 Ecstatic Weanderings with Greg Burk (Jazzwerkstatt, 2012)
 Ultra Minor with Jon Catler (FreeNote, 2018)

With Compost
 Take Off Your Body (Columbia, 1971)
 Life Is Round (Columbia, 1973)

The Free Spirits
 Out of Sight and Sound (ABC, 1967)
 Live at the Scene (Sunbeam, 2011) – live

As sideman
With Gary Burton
 Lofty Fake Anagram (RCA, 1967)
 A Genuine Tong Funeral (RCA, 1968)
 Gary Burton Quartet in Concert (RCA, 1968)
 Ring (ECM, 1974)
 Dreams So Real (ECM, 1976)

With Michael Gibbs
 In the Public Interest (Polydor, 1974)
 Directs the Only Chrome-Waterfall Orchestra (Bronze, 1975)
 Big Music (Venture, 1988)
 By the Way (Ah Um, 1993)

With Steve Kuhn
 Motility (ECM, 1977)
 Non-Fiction (ECM, 1978)
 Playground (ECM, 1980)
 Last Year's Waltz (ECM, 1982)

With Dave Liebman
 Drum Ode (ECM, 1975)
 Homage to John Coltrane (Owl, 1987)
 Spirit Renewed (Owl, 1991)

With Steve Marcus
 Tomorrow Never Knows (Vortex, 1968)
 Count's Rock Band (Vortex, 1969)
 The Lord's Prayer (Vortex, 1969)

With Tisziji Muñoz
 The Paradox of Independence (Anami Music, 2014)
 When Coltrane Calls! Session 3: Living Immortality (Anami Music, 2015)
 Scream of Ensoundment (Anami Music, 2017)

With others
 Roland Kirk, I Talk with the Spirits (Limelight, 1965)
 Larry Coryell, Lady Coryell (Vanguard, 1968)
 Danny Kalb, Crosscurrents (Cotillion, 1969)
 Terumasa Hino, Hino's Journey to Air (Love 1970)
 Todd Rundgren, Runt (Ampex, 1970)
 Paul Bley, The Paul Bley Synthesizer Show (Milestone, 1971)
 Gunter Hampel, Ballet-Symphony No 5, Symphony No. 6 The Music of Gunter Hampel (1971)
 Pat Metheny, Bright Size Life (ECM 1976)
 David Friesen, Waterfall Rainbow (Inner City, 1977)
 Gil Goldstein, Pure As Rain (Chiaroscuro, 1977)
 Roland Kirk, Kirk's Works (Mercury, 1977)
 Ernie Krivda, Satanic (Inner City, 1977)
 Ernie Krivda, The Alchemist (Inner City, 1978)
 Franco Ambrosetti, Close Encounter  (Enja, 1978)
 Hal Galper, Speak with a Single Voice (Century, 1979)
 Steve Swallow, Home  (ECM, 1980)
 Aki Takase, ABC (Union Jazz, 1982)
 George Gruntz, Theatre (ECM, 1984)
 Emily Remler, Transitions (Concord Jazz, 1984)
 Emily Remler, Catwalk (Concord Jazz, 1985)
 Tony Dagradi, Sweet Remembrance (Gramavision, 1987)
 George Gruntz, Happening Now! (hat ART 1988)
 Torsten de Winkel, Torsten De Winkel Acoustic Quartet (Hot Wire, 1991)
 Hal Galper, Redux '78 (Concord Jazz, 1991)
 Torsten de Winkel, Tribute: Talking to the Spirits (Hot Wire, 1993)
 Kustomized, The Battle for Space (Matador, 1995)
 Paul Bley, Circles (Milestone, 2004)
 Brian Landrus, Forward (Cadence, 2009)
 Darius Jones, Man'ish Boy (A Raw & Beautiful Thing) (AUM Fidelity, 2009)
 Brian Landrus, Everlasting (CIMP, 2011)
 Kari Ikonen, Ikonostasis (Ozella, 2017)
 Bukky Leo, 'Spaceships Over Africa', (Ra Kalam Records, 2017)
 Vinny Golia & Henry Kaiser, Astral Plane Crash (Balance Point, 2018)
 Burton Greene, Damon Smith, Life's Intense Mystery (Astral Spirits/Monofonus 2019)
 Henry Kaiser, More Requia (Metalanguage, 2019)
 Samo Salamon, Arild Andersen & Ra Kalam Bob Moses, Pure and Simple (Samo Records, 2022)

References
Footnotes

General references
 Scott Yanow, [ Bob Moses] at AllMusic

American jazz drummers
Musicians from New York (state)
1948 births
Living people
20th-century American drummers
American male drummers
20th-century American male musicians
American male jazz musicians
The Free Spirits members
Compost (band) members
Gramavision Records artists